Castle Point is a district of Essex, United Kingdom.

Castle Point or Castlepoint may also refer to:

 Castle Point (New Zealand), headland at Castlepoint in New Zealand
 Castle Point Lighthouse, lighthouse on this headland
 Castle Point (UK Parliament constituency), United Kingdom parliament constituency
 Castle Point, Missouri, census-designated place in St. Louis County, Missouri, United States
 Castle Point, New Jersey, place in New Jersey, United States
 Castle Point, New York, hamlet in Dutchess County, New York, United States
 Castle Point Anime Convention, anime convention in Secaucus, New Jersey, United States
 Castlepoint, New Zealand settlement
 Castlepoint Shopping Centre, Bournemouth, Dorset, England